2012–13 Eurocup Basketball was the 11th edition of Europe's second-tier level transnational competition for men's professional basketball clubs, the EuroCup. The EuroCup is the European-wide league level that is one level below the EuroLeague. The winner of this competition earned a place at the group stage of the next season's EuroLeague.

In this edition, semifinals were played in home-and-away series, and the final in a single game. Eurocup Qualifying Rounds were deleted.

The final game was played at Spiroudome in Charleroi, Belgium.

Teams
32 teams participated in the Eurocup Regular Season:

 A total of 25 teams qualified directly to the 32-team regular season through their results in domestic competitions, or through a wild card.
 The remaining 7 teams were filled with the losers of the Euroleague qualifying rounds.

 Bold indicates that these teams qualified as losers from the Euroleague qualifying rounds.

  Stelmet Zielona Góra joined the Eurocup after VAP Kolossos resigned its berth.
  Cajasol Sevilla joined the Eurocup after Lagun Aro GBC resigned its berth.
  Budivelnik Kiev joined the Eurocup after EiffelTowers Den Bosch resigned its berth.

  indicates that these teams qualified through a wild card.

Draw
The draws for the 2012–13 Eurocup were held on Tuesday, 9 October, after the Euroleague Qualifying Rounds were played.

Teams were seeded into four pots of eight teams, according to their points in the European basketball club rankings.

Regular season

The top two teams from each group advanced to the top 16. The match-days were on 7 November, 14 November, 27 November, 5 December and 12 December 2012.

Group A

Group B

Group C

Group D

Group E

Group F

Group G

Group H

Last 16
The Last 16 phase began January 9.

If teams were level on record at the end of the Last 16 phase, tiebreakers were applied in the following order:
 Head-to-head record.
 Head-to-head point differential.
 Point differential during the Last 16 phase.
 Points scored during the Last 16 phase.
 Sum of quotients of points scored and points allowed in each Last 16 phase match.

Group I

Group J

Group K

Group L

Knockout stage

Bracket

Quarterfinals

The quarterfinals were two-legged ties determined on aggregate score. The first legs were played on March 6, and the return legs were played on March 13. The group winner in each tie, listed as "Team #1", hosted the second leg.

Semifinals
The semifinals were two-legged ties determined on aggregate score. The first legs were played on March 20, and the return legs were played on March 26–27. The team finishing in the higher Last 16 place, listed as "Team #1", hosted the second leg.

Final
The final took place on April 13, 2013, in Spiroudome, Charleroi, Belgium.

Individual statistics

Rating

Points

Rebounds

Assists

Awards

MVP Weekly

Regular season

Top 16

Quarterfinals

Semifinals

Eurocup MVP
  Nick Calathes (Lokomotiv-Kuban)

Eurocup Finals MVP
  Richard Hendrix (Lokomotiv-Kuban)

All-Eurocup Teams

Coach of the Year
 Fotis Katsikaris (Uxúe Bilbao Basket)

Rising Star
 Bojan Dubljević (Valencia Basket)

See also
 2012–13 Euroleague
 EuroChallenge 2012–13

References

External links

 
Euro
2012-13